Jaśkowice Legnickie  is a village in the administrative district of Gmina Kunice, within Legnica County, Lower Silesian Voivodeship, in south-western Poland. After the expulsion of Germans from Poland the German population was forced to leave the region and go to the modern day German border.

Before 1945 the village was in Germany by the name Jeschkendorf.

References

Villages in Legnica County